Julian Notary (1455–1523) was an English printer and bookseller.

Career 
As a printer of books, Notary frequently collaborated with Wynkyn de Worde. He had a French associate named Jean Barbier. In the colophon to his books, he writes that he lived in Kings street near Westminster. His earliest work is dated to 20 December 1498.

Notary was also a bookbinder.

He used the initials of "I.N." as a printers mark on his books.

References

External links 
 Dictionary of National Biography
 Cambridge University Library
 Google Books

1455 births
1523 deaths
English printers
English booksellers
Printers of incunabula